Elizabeth Associations were German Catholic female charitable associations which at the start of the twentieth century had 16,000 members in 550 branches.

References

Catholic Church in Germany
Charities based in Germany